Audrey Wasilewski is an American television, film and voice actress.

Biography

Voice over
Voices multiple roles on Disney Jr's Alice's Wonderland Bakery including Alice's cat "Dinah," "Chamomille" the door mouse and "Threeanne of Hearts."

In 1997 she became the official voice of E.T. the Extra-Terrestrial for Dreamworks voicing the iconic alien for various commercials, toys, video games with a debut at Super Bowl XXXIII.

Wasilewski's first role came in the 1994 Japanese animated film Heisei Tanuki Gassen Ponpoko, where she was one of the additional voices dubbing in English. She voiced Tuck, Misty, XJ-7 and XJ-8 on the Nickelodeon animated series My Life as a Teenage Robot in 2003 and has worked on 3 projects in the Scooby-Doo franchise: Scooby-Doo and the Alien Invaders, Scooby-Doo! Mystery Inc Grasp of the Gnome, and Scooby-Doo! and the Gourmet Ghost. She voices a veterinarian named Dr. Glove in Back at the Barnyard. In 2007, opposite Frank Welker she voiced Garfield's love interest Arlene in the animated direct-to-video film Garfield Gets Real, and reprised the character on The Garfield Show. The following year. Wasilewski also voiced Bessie in Random! Cartoons, had a recurring role as Barb in Sym-Bionic Titan, and she also voices Terk in a Tarzan video game. Once again voicing the love interest to a Frank Welker character, she is Ortensia, Oswald the Lucky Rabbit's cat wife in Epic Mickey 2: The Power of Two. League of Assassins member in Batman: Arkham City, Police Chief Rambamboo for Nickelodeon's Breadwinners and characters in Infinity Train, Disney Infinity 3.0 and Skylanders: SuperChargers.

Film and television
She plays "Alpha Officer" in the Daniels' 2022 sci-fi action release Everything Everywhere All at Once.

The award-winning 2022 film North Star, written and directed by PJ Palmer, has Audrey starring opposite Coleman Domingo, Malcom Gets, Kevin Bacon, and Laura Innes.

Writer/Director Filip Jan Rymsza cast her as "Sally the Secretary" in his 2020 psychological thriller Mosquito State.

She is best known for her roles on the drama series Big Love as Pam Martin and on Mad Men as Anita Olson Respola.

In the 2010 film Red, Wasilewski appeared in a cameo alongside Bruce Willis and John Malkovich in which she played a doomed "gun for hire" sent to assassinate them. Also in 2010, she played the character of Deb in the film Lying to be Perfect.

She has made over 100 guest appearances in TV series, such as, 9-1-1, Homecoming, Defending Jacob, Love, Victor, Young Sheldon, Ghosted, Friends, Two and a Half Men, Ally McBeal, George & Leo, Total Security, Saved by the Bell, Party of Five, Diagnosis Murder, State of Grace, The Nightmare Room, Providence, Charmed, Cold Case, ER, General Hospital, Push, The West Wing, Wonderfalls, The Bernie Mac Show, Boston Legal, Scandal, Family Guy, Monk, Mad, Without a Trace, and many more.

In 2008, Wasilewski played the supporting role of Heidi in the feature film Clear Lake, WI, starring Michael Madsen.

Filmography

Film

Television

Video games

References

External links
 
 

Living people
American people of Polish descent
American radio actresses
American film actresses
American television actresses
American video game actresses
20th-century American actresses
21st-century American actresses
Year of birth missing (living people)
Place of birth missing (living people)